The 1975 Wightman Cup was the 47th edition of the annual women's team tennis competition between the United States and Great Britain. It was held at the Public Auditorium in Cleveland, Ohio in the United States.

References

1975
1975 in tennis
1975 in women's tennis
1975 in American tennis
1975 in British sport